Aleksey Valeryevich Antonyuk (born 28 April 1984) is a Russian football coach and a former player. He is the goalkeepers coach with FC Rodina Moscow.

Coaching career
Following a short playing career at amateur levels, Antonyuk became a goalkeeping coach. On 10 January 2017, Antonyuk was hired by Russian Premier League club FC Krasnodar. On 2 March 2022, he was appointed caretaker manager of Krasnodar, following the resignation of Daniel Farke and his assistants. Before the Krasnodar game against FC Ural Yekaterinburg, Aleksandr Storozhuk was registered with the league as the caretaker.

References

External links
 Profile by the Russian Premier League
 Profile by FootballFacts (in Russian)

1984 births
Living people
Russian footballers
Association football goalkeepers
FC Lada-Tolyatti players
Russian football managers
FC Krasnodar managers
Russian Premier League managers